This is a list of Monmouth Hawks players in the NFL Draft.

Key

Selections

References

Lists of National Football League draftees by college football team

Monmouth Hawks NFL Draft